The Kavita Radheshyam Animal Movement (KRAM) is an internet-based animal rights movement started by Bollywood actress and animal activist Kavita Radheshyam.  Radheshyam held a naked photo shoot to spotlight cruelty against animals in India, and became the brand ambassador for the International Organization for the Protection of Animals (OIPA), an Italian-based animal rights group. Unsatisfied with the way the organization worked, Kavita left and started KRAM.

See also 
 Animal welfare and rights in India

References

Animal welfare organisations based in India
Animal rights organizations